The 2024 West Virginia gubernatorial election will be held on November 5, 2024, to elect the governor of West Virginia, concurrently with the 2024 U.S. presidential election, as well as elections to the United States Senate and elections to the United States House of Representatives and various state and local elections. Incumbent Republican Governor Jim Justice is term-limited and cannot seek re-election to a third consecutive term in office.

Background 
A conservative southern state, West Virginia is considered safely Republican at the federal level, with all state-wide elected officials (excluding Joe Manchin) belonging to the Republican Party. In the 2020 presidential election, Donald Trump carried West Virginia by nearly 40 percentage points. However, until 2020, Democrats would mostly safely win governor races in West Virginia.

Incumbent governor Jim Justice was first elected in 2016 as a Democrat, defeating Bill Cole by 7 percentage points. Justice was re-elected in 2020 as a Republican, defeating Ben Salango by about 30 percentage points. Justice is term-limited and can not run again.

With Jim Justice term-limited, the Republican primary is expected to be competitive and crowded. Most analysts consider Republicans to be a heavy favorite, given the state's partisan lean and the margins from the previous election.

Republican primary

Candidates

Declared
Moore Capito, state delegate (2016–present), grandson of former governor Arch Moore, and son of U.S. Senator Shelley Moore Capito
J.B. McCuskey, West Virginia State Auditor (2017–present)
Chris Miller, automobile dealer and son of U.S. Representative Carol Miller
Mac Warner, West Virginia Secretary of State (2017–present)
Rashida Yost, preschool owner

Publicly expressed interest
David McKinley, former U.S. Representative for West Virginia's 1st congressional district (2011–2023)
Patrick Morrisey, West Virginia Attorney General (2013–present) and nominee for U.S. Senate in 2018 (decision expected by April 2023)

Potential
Evan Jenkins, former Chief Justice of the West Virginia Supreme Court of Appeals (2021–2022) from position 5 (2018–2022), former U.S. Representative from West Virginia's 3rd congressional district (2015–2018), and candidate for U.S. Senate in 2018

Declined
Kent Leonhardt, West Virginia Commissioner of Agriculture (2017–present) (running for re-election)
Riley Moore, West Virginia State Treasurer (2021–present) and grandson of former governor Arch Moore (running for U.S. House)

Endorsements

Democratic primary
Candidates
Publicly expressed interest
Steve Williams, mayor of Huntington (2013–present) and former state delegate (1986–1994)

Declined
Joe Manchin, U.S. Senator (2010–present) and former governor (2005–2010)

Other candidates
America Coming Together Party
 Declared 
S. Marshall Wilson, former Republican state delegate (2017–2021) and write-in candidate for governor in 2020

Mountain Party
 Publicly expressed interest 
Chase Linko-Looper, activist and U.S. Army veteran (decision expected in May 2023)''

General election

Predictions

References

External links
Official campaign websites 
Moore Capito (R) for Governor
J.B. McCuskey (R) for Governor
Chris Miller (R) for Governor
Rashida Yost (R) for Governor

2024
Governor
West Virginia